Acianthera macropoda is a species of orchid.

macropoda